Boundary Lake is a small lake on the border between Canada and the United States, in the Canadian province of Manitoba and the American state of North Dakota. At 1.1 ha (3 acres) its west island is one of the world's smallest land masses split by an international border.

External links
Islands divided by international borders

Bodies of water of Bottineau County, North Dakota
Lakes of Manitoba
Lakes of North Dakota
Canada–United States border
International lakes of North America